The Greenville and Knoxville Railroad was a South Carolina railroad that operated in the early 20th century.

The Greenville and Knoxville was formed in 1907, to reopen the 16-mile route between Greenville, South Carolina, and River Falls, South Carolina, abandoned by the Carolina, Knoxville and Western Railway a few years early.

In 1914 the railroad once again reorganized, this time as the Greenville and Western Railroad. It was renamed the Greenville and Northern Railway six years later.

References

Defunct South Carolina railroads
Railway companies established in 1907
Railway companies disestablished in 1914